Cleo is a 2019 Belgian drama film directed and written by Eva Cools, her first feature-length film.

Background
Cools funded the film with support from the Flemish Audiovisual Fund, Screen Brussels and via additional support from crowdsourcing.

Plot
Cleo is the story of a 17-year-old girl who survives a serious road accident. Her parents did not have that chance. After this fatal night, she gets lost in Brussels and takes refuge with Leos, a mysterious man older than her. Cleo's father was a renowned pianist, and the girl has been playing since a very young age. If Cleo likes to listen to contemporary music, it is the piano (and especially the work of Rachmaninov) that is at the heart of her reconstruction process.

Cast
 Anna Franziska Jaeger as Cleo
 Roy Aernouts as Leos
 Natali Broods as Arianne
 Yolande Moreau as Jet
 Martha Canga Antonio as Myra
 Jan Hammenecker as De Wachter
 Lucie Debay as Jeanne
 Ishaq El Akel as Bruno

Production
Principal photography on the film began on 24 January 2018 and lasted til 9 March 2018 in Belgium.

Accolades
Cools won the Visser-Neerlandia Prize in 2016 for the film's script.
Cools' debut film Cleo won the Alice MyMovies Award at the Italian Alice Nella Città film festival. 

At the 10th Magritte Awards, Cleo received two nominations in the categories of Best Flemish Film and Best Supporting Actress for Yolande Moreau.

References

External links
 

2019 films
2019 comedy films
Belgian comedy films
2010s French-language films
French-language Belgian films
2010s French films